Protea mundii, the forest sugarbush, is a flowering shrub native to the Cape Provinces of South Africa, growing in forest margins at  elevation. The plant has white to ivory flowers, which are attractive to bees, butterflies and/or birds. The specific name commemorates Johannes Ludwig Leopold Mund, a German natural history collector who was active in the Cape until 1831.

Protea mundii is cultivated as a garden plant.

References

mundii
Flora of the Cape Provinces
Garden plants of Southern Africa
Butterfly food plants